Pinus balfouriana, the foxtail pine, is a rare high-elevation pine that is endemic to California, United States. It is closely related to the Great Basin and Rocky Mountain bristlecone pines, in the subsection Balfourianae.

Description 

Distribution 
In the Sierra Nevada, Foxtail pines are limited to the area around Sequoia and Kings Canyon National Parks. In both areas, it is often a tree line species.

There are two disjunct populations:

A small outlying population was reported in southern Oregon, but was proven to have been misidentified.

Age 
It is thought that P. balfouriana can live up to 3000 years in the Sierra Nevada, although the highest currently proven age is 2110 years. In the Klamath Mountains, ages are only known to about 1000 years.

Related species 
P. balfouriana is closely related to the bristlecone pines, being classified in the same subsection Balfourianae; it has been hybridised with the Great Basin Bristlecone Pine in cultivation, though no hybrids have ever been found in the wild.

References

Further reading 
 
 Bailey, D.K. 1970. Phytogeography and taxonomy of Pinus subsection Balfourianae. Ann. Missouri Bot. Gard. 57: 210–249.
 Mastrogiuseppe, R.J. & Mastrogiuseppe, J.D. 1980. A study of Pinus balfouriana Grev. & Balf. (Pinaceae). Systematic Botany 5: 86–104.
 Richardson, D.M. (ed.). 1998. Ecology and Biogeography of Pinus. Cambridge University Press, Cambridge. 530 p. .

External links 

 Calflora: Pinus balfouriana CalFlora Database: Pinus balfouriana (foxtail pine)
 Gymnosperm Database – Pinus balfouriana
 USDA Plants Profile for Pinus balfouriana (foxtail pine)
 Arboretum de Villardebelle – photos of cones
 High Elevation White Pine Educational Website: Pinus balfouriana
 Conifercountry.com: Foxtail Pines in Northwest California
 

balfouriana
Endemic flora of California
Trees of the Southwestern United States
Flora of the Klamath Mountains
Flora of the Sierra Nevada (United States)
Near threatened plants
Taxa named by John Hutton Balfour